Warrior Wrestling is an American independent professional wrestling promotion based in Chicago Heights, Illinois.

Roster

Adam Brooks (wrestler)
Alex Coughlin
Alex Shelley
Alex Zayne
Alpha Wolf
Anthony Bowens
Anthony Henry
AQA (wrestler)
Aramis
Arez
ASF
Athena (wrestler), current Warrior Wrestling Women's Champion
Bandido
Beastman
Blake Christian
Brian Cage
Brian Pillman Jr.
Camaro Jackson
Chelsea Green
Clark Connors
Dalton Castle
Dan The Dad
Dante Leon
Dante Martin
Darius Martin
Davey Bang
Davey Richards
Deonna Purrazzo
Dominic Garrini
Drago Kid
Dragon Bane
Fuego Del Sol
Golden Dragon
Gringo Loco
Heather Reckless
Isaias Velazquez
Jake Crist
Jake Something
Janai Kai
Jay Briscoe
JD Drake
Jeff Cobb
Jonah
Karl Fredericks
KC Navarro, current Warrior Wrestling Champion
Kevin Ku
Killer Kross
Kylie Rae
Lance Archer
Lince Dorado
Mark Briscoe
Max Caster
Mike Bailey
Mike Bennett
Mike Outlaw
Mil Muertes
Miranda Alize
Myron Reed
Nick Wayne
Ninja Mack
Psycho Clown
Rey Leon
Rohit Raju
Sam Adonis, current Warrior Wrestling Lucha Champion
Santana
Shazza McKenzie
Silas Young
Skye Blue
Storm Grayson
Swerve Strickland
Tessa Blanchard
Thunder Rosa
Tom Lawlor
Tootie Lynn
Trey Miguel
Warhorse
Will Ospreay
Yuya Uemura
Zachary Wentz

Championships
.

Championship history

Warrior Wrestling Championship 

, there have been five reigns between five champions with one vacancy. Brian Cage holds three records for this title, first he is the inaugural champion, he has longest reign with title at 531 days, while Will Ospreay's reign is shortest at 188 days and third he is also the oldest champion by winning title at 34 years, while KC Navarrois the youngest champion at age of 22.

, the champion is KC Navarro who is in his first reign. He won the War of Attrition on June 18, 2022, at Warrior Wrestling 23 in Grand Rapids, Michigan.

Reigns

Warrior Wrestling Lucha Championship 

, there have been two reigns between two champions. Aramis was the inaugural champion. Sam Adonis was the oldest champion when he won it at 32 years old, while Aramis was the youngest champion at 22 years old.

Sam Adonis is the current champion in his first reign. He defeated Aramis at Warrior Wrestling 18 on January 22, 2022, in South Bend, Indiana.

Reigns

Warrior Wrestling Women's Championship 

, there have been four reigns between four champions with one vacancy. Tessa Blanchard was the inaugural champion. Blanchard's reign is the longest at 489 days, while Thunder Rosa's reign is the shortest at 245 days. Rosa was the oldest champion when she won it at 35 years old, while Blanchard was the youngest champion at 23 years old.

Athena is the current champion in his first reign. She defeated Shazza McKenzie and Skye Blue in a triple threat match for the vacant title at Warrior Wrestling 21 on April 23, 2022, in South Bend, Indiana.

Reigns

References

External links 
 Warrior Wrestling Official website
 Warrior Wrestling Promotion Profile at Cagematch.net

American professional wrestling promotions
2018 in professional wrestling
American companies established in 2018